Emanuele Mollica (Naples, 1820 – 1877) was an Italian painter, mainly of costume genre pieces and Neo-Pompeian themes.

Among his paintings are: A music concert in Cicero's house in Pompei; Cicero in Pompei; and Pompeian Songstress (exhibited in 1877 at Naples); In the Triclinium at Pompei; Donna napolitano; and Un bagno a Pompei.

References

19th-century Italian painters
Italian male painters
Painters from Naples
Neo-Pompeian painters
Italian costume genre painters
19th-century Italian male artists